Lahar Assembly constituency is one of the 230 Vidhan Sabha (Legislative Assembly) constituencies of Madhya Pradesh state in central India. This constituency came into existence in 1951, as one of the 79 Vidhan Sabha constituencies of the erstwhile Madhya Bharat state.

Overview
Lahar (constituency number 11) is one of the 5 Vidhan Sabha constituencies located in Bhind district. This constituency covers the entire Mihona and Lahar tehsils and part of Raun tehsil.

Lahar is part of Bhind Lok Sabha constituency along with seven other Vidhan Sabha segments, namely, Ater, Bhind, Mehgaon and Gohad in this district and Sewda, Bhander and Datia in Datia district.

Members of Legislative Assembly

As a constituency of Madhya Bharat

 1951: Ram Chaudhary, Indian National Congress / Hargovind  Indian National Congress

As a constituency of Madhya Pradesh

See also
 Lahar

References

Bhind district
Assembly constituencies of Madhya Pradesh